Harmuiyeh (also Romanized as Hārmū’īyeh and Hormū’īyeh; also known as Farmū’īyeh) is a village in Gughar Rural District, in the Central District of Baft County, Kerman Province, Iran. At the 2006 census, its population was 117, in 30 families.

References 

Populated places in Baft County